Hattigudur is a panchayat village in the southern state of Karnataka, India. Administratively, Hattigudur is under Shahapur taluka of Yadgir district in Karnataka.  Hattigudur is 12 km by road south of the town of Shahapur and 9 km by road southwest of Gundgurthi. The nearest railhead is in Yadgir.

Demographics 
 census, Hattigudur had 2,356 inhabitants, with 1,169 males and 1,187 females.

Notes

External links 
 

Villages in Yadgir district